Chapungu United is a Zimbabwean football club based in Gweru currently playing in the Zimbabwe Division 1 (Central Region). Their home stadium is Ascot Stadium.

They used to play in the top division in Zimbabwean football, but were relegated to Zimbabwe's Second Division in 2009. They were promoted back to the top flight league in 2014.

Chapungu have won two honours, the first being the Zimbabwean Independence Trophy in 1994 when they beat Eiffel Flats 4-1, and the second the Zimbabwean Cup in 1995 which they won in a walkover after the other semifinal was never completed. The other  They failed to defend the Independence Cup in 1995 after losing 5-0 in the final.

They also appeared in the 2006 Castle Cup final, losing 1-0 to Mwana Africa, and the 1988 Independence Cup, losing 1-0 to Highlanders.

Achievements
Zimbabwean Cup: 1
 1995
Zimbabwean Independence Trophy: 1
 1994

Performance in CAF competitions
CAF Cup Winners' Cup: 1 appearance
1996 – First Round

Current squad

References

Gweru
Football clubs in Zimbabwe